The 2004 New York Yankees season was the 102nd season for the team. The Yankees opened the season by playing two games against the Tampa Bay Devil Rays in Japan on March 30, 2004. The team finished with a record of 101-61, finishing 3 games ahead of the Boston Red Sox in the AL East. The 2004 season was the Yankees third straight season of 100+ wins, the first such instance in franchise history. New York was managed by Joe Torre. In the playoffs, the Yankees defeated the Minnesota Twins, 3 games to 1, in the ALDS, before losing to the wild card Boston Red Sox, 4 games to 3, in the ALCS. The 2004 Yankees are notable as the only team in MLB history to lose a 7-game playoff series after taking a 3 games to none lead. This was the fourth straight year in which the Yankees lost to the eventual World Series champions in the postseason. Only the Los Angeles Dodgers (2016–19) have duplicated the same feat.

Offseason

October 27, 2003: Luis Sojo was released by the New York Yankees.
December 16, 2003: Nick Johnson was traded by the New York Yankees with Randy Choate and Juan Rivera to the Montreal Expos for Javier Vázquez.
December 23, 2003: Buddy Carlyle was signed as a free agent with the New York Yankees.
 January 6, 2004: Kenny Lofton signed as a free agent with the New York Yankees.
February 5, 2004: Mike Lamb was traded by the Texas Rangers to the New York Yankees for Jose Garcia (minors).
 February 16, 2004: The New York Yankees sent Alfonso Soriano and a player to be named later were sent to the Texas Rangers in exchange for Alex Rodriguez. The New York Yankees sent Joaquin Arias (April 23, 2004) to the Texas Rangers to complete the trade.
March 25, 2004: Mike Lamb was traded by the New York Yankees to the Houston Astros for Juan DeLeon (minors).

Regular season

Season Summary

July
Derek Jeter dives into stands chasing and catching a pop up in the 12th inning of a 3 to 3 game against the Boston Red Sox, the play was later named the dive.

August
On August 31 the Yankees had their worst loss in history by run differential, losing 22–0 to the Cleveland Indians.

September
On September 30 the Yankees clinched their division.

Season standings

Record vs. opponents

Notable transactions
June 7, 2004: Phil Hughes was drafted by the New York Yankees in the 1st round (23rd pick) of the 2004 amateur draft. Player signed June 16, 2004.
July 22, 2004: Donzell McDonald was signed as a free agent with the New York Yankees.
July 31, 2004: Esteban Loaiza was traded by the Chicago White Sox to the New York Yankees for José Contreras and cash.
August 3, 2004: John Olerud was signed as a free agent with the New York Yankees.
August 17, 2004: Shane Spencer signed as a free agent with the New York Yankees.

Roster

Game log 

|- bgcolor="ffbbbb"
| 1 || March 30 || @ Devil Rays || 3–8 || Zambrano (1–0) || Mussina (0–1) || — || Tokyo Dome || 55,000 || 0–1
|- bgcolor="bbffbb"
| 2 || March 31 || @ Devil Rays || 12–1 || Brown (1–0) || González (0–1) || — || Tokyo Dome || 55,000 || 1–1

|- bgcolor="ffbbbb"
| 3 || April 6 || @ Devil Rays || 4–9 || Zambrano (2–0) || Mussina (0–2) || — || Tropicana Field || 41,755 || 1–2
|- bgcolor="bbffbb"
| 4 || April 7 || @ Devil Rays || 3–2 || Brown (2–0) || Abbott (0–1) || Rivera (1) || Tropicana Field || 31,669 || 2–2
|- bgcolor="bbffbb"
| 5 || April 8 || White Sox || 3–1 || Vazquez (1–0) || Schoeneweis (0–1) || Rivera (2) || Yankee Stadium || 55,290 || 3–2
|- bgcolor="ffbbbb"
| 6 || April 9 || White Sox || 3–9 || Garland (1–0) || Contreras (0–1) || — || Yankee Stadium || 45,965 || 3–3
|- bgcolor="ffbbbb"
| 7 || April 10 || White Sox || 3–7 || Buehrle (1–0) || DePaula (0–1) || — || Yankee Stadium || 47,911 || 3–4
|- bgcolor="bbffbb"
| 8 || April 11 || White Sox || 5–4 || Mussina (1–2) || Wright (0–1) || Rivera (3) || Yankee Stadium || 37,484 || 4–4
|- bgcolor="bbbbbb"
| – || April 13 || Devil Rays || colspan=8|Postponed (rain) Rescheduled for September 6
|- bgcolor="bbffbb"
| 9 || April 14 || Devil Rays || 5–1 || Brown (3–0) || Hendrickson (0–1) || — || Yankee Stadium || 37,914 || 5–4
|- bgcolor="ffbbbb"
| 10 || April 16 || @ Red Sox || 2–6 || Wakefield (1–0) || Vazquez (1–1) || — || Fenway Park || 35,163 || 5–5
|- bgcolor="ffbbbb"
| 11 || April 17 || @ Red Sox || 2–5 || Schilling (2–0) || Mussina (1–3) || — || Fenway Park || 35,023 || 5–6
|- bgcolor="bbffbb"
| 12 || April 18 || @ Red Sox || 7–3 || Quantrill (1–0) || Lowe (1–1) || — || Fenway Park || 35,011 || 6–6
|- bgcolor="ffbbbb"
| 13 || April 19 || @ Red Sox || 4–5 || Timlin (1–1) || Gordon (0–1) || Foulke (3) || Fenway Park || 35,027 || 6–7
|- bgcolor="bbffbb"
| 14 || April 20 || @ White Sox || 11–8 || Quantrill (2–0) || Buehrle (1–1) || Rivera (4) || U.S. Cellular Field || 32,034 || 7–7
|- bgcolor="bbffbb"
| 15 || April 21 || @ White Sox || 3–1 || Vazquez (2–1) || Garland (1–1) || Rivera (5) || U.S. Cellular Field || 26,154 || 8–7
|- bgcolor="ffbbbb"
| 16 || April 22 || @ White Sox || 3–4 || Schoeneweis (2–1) || Mussina (1–4) || Marte (2) || U.S. Cellular Field || 34,030 || 8–8
|- bgcolor="ffbbbb"
| 17 || April 23 || Red Sox || 2–11 || Lowe (2–1) || Contreras (0–2) || — || Yankee Stadium || 55,001 || 8–9
|- bgcolor="ffbbbb"
| 18 || April 24 || Red Sox || 2–3  || Foulke (1–0) || Quantrill (2–1) || Timlin (1) || Yankee Stadium || 55,195 || 8–10
|- bgcolor="ffbbbb"
| 19 || April 25 || Red Sox || 0–2 || Martinez (3–1) || Vazquez (2–2) || Williamson (1) || Yankee Stadium || 55,338 || 8–11
|- bgcolor="bbffbb"
| 20 || April 27 || Athletics || 10–8 || Osborne (1–0) || Mecir (0–2) || Rivera (6) || Yankee Stadium || 33,191 || 9–11
|- bgcolor="bbffbb"
| 21 || April 28 || Athletics || 5–1 || Contreras (1–2) || Mulder (2–2) || Gordon (1) || Yankee Stadium || 44,325 || 10–11
|- bgcolor="bbffbb"
| 22 || April 29 || Athletics || 7–5 || Brown (4–0) || Zito (2–3) || Rivera (7) || Yankee Stadium || 35,651 || 11–11
|- bgcolor="bbffbb"
| 23 || April 30 || Royals || 5–2 || Vázques (3–2) || Anderson (1–2) || Rivera (8) || Yankee Stadium || 43,237 || 12–11

|- bgcolor="bbffbb"
| 24 || May 1 || Royals || 12–4 || Lieber (1–0) || Villacis (0–1) || — || Yankee Stadium || 54,103 || 13–11
|- bgcolor="bbffbb"
| 25 || May 2 || Royals || 4–2 || Mussina (2–4) || Affeldt (0–3) || Rivera (9) || Yankee Stadium || 49,208 || 14–11
|- bgcolor="bbffbb"
| 26 || May 4 || @ Athletics || 10–8 || Osborne (2–0) || Bradford (1–1) || Rivera (10) || Network Associates Coliseum || 35,081 || 15–11
|- bgcolor="bbffbb"
| 27 || May 5 || @ Athletics || 4–3 || Quantrill (3–1) || Rhodes (0–1) || Rivera (11) || Network Associates Coliseum || 43,227 || 16–11
|- bgcolor="ffbbbb"
| 28 || May 6 || @ Athletics || 4–7 || Harden (1–2) || Vazquez (3–3) || Mecir (1) || Network Associates Coliseum || 38,417 || 16–12
|- bgcolor="ffbbbb"
| 29 || May 7 || @ Mariners || 2–6 || Franklin (2–2) || Lieber (1–1) || — || Safeco Field || 46,491 || 16–13
|- bgcolor="bbffbb"
| 30 || May 8 || @ Mariners || 6–0 || Mussina (3–4) || Meche (1–3) || — || Safeco Field || 46,454 || 17–13
|- bgcolor="bbffbb"
| 31 || May 9 || @ Mariners || 7–6 || Quantrill (4–1) || Soriano (0–3) || Rivera (12) || Safeco Field || 46,589 || 18–13
|- bgcolor="bbffbb"
| 32 || May 11 || Angels || 8–7  || Gordon (1–1) || Weber (0–1) || — || Yankee Stadium || 36,706 || 19–13
|- bgcolor="ffbbbb"
| 33 || May 12 || Angels || 2–11 || Sele (2–0) || Vázquez (3–4) || — || Yankee Stadium || 49,954 || 19–14
|- bgcolor="bbffbb"
| 34 || May 13 || Angels || 7–4 || Lieber (2–1) || Lackey (3–4) || Rivera (13) || Yankee Stadium || 41,089 || 20–14
|- bgcolor="bbffbb"
| 35 || May 14 || Mariners || 9–5 || Mussina (4–4) || Villone (3–2) || — || Yankee Stadium || 49,653 || 21–14
|- bgcolor="ffbbbb"
| 36 || May 15 || Mariners || 7–13  || Guardado (1–0) || White (0–1) || — || Yankee Stadium || 54,531 || 21–15
|- bgcolor="bbffbb"
| 37 || May 16 || Mariners || 2–1 || Brown (5–0) || Piñeiro (1–5) || Rivera (14) || Yankee Stadium || 54,732 || 22–15
|- bgcolor="ffbbbb"
| 38 || May 18 || @ Angels || 0–1  || Shields (3–0) || Quantrill (4–2)  || — || Angel Stadium of Anaheim || 43,660 || 22–16
|- bgcolor="bbffbb"
| 39 || May 19 || @ Angels || 4–2 || Lieber (3–1) || Lackey (3–5) || Rivera (15) || Angel Stadium of Anaheim || 43,742 || 23–16
|- bgcolor="bbffbb"
| 40 || May 20 || @ Angels || 6–2 || Mussina (5–4) || Colon (4–3) || — || Angel Stadium of Anaheim || 43,810 || 24–16
|- bgcolor="ffbbbb"
| 41 || May 21 || @ Rangers || 7–9 || Benoit (2–1) || Brown (5–1) || Cordero (14) || The Ballpark in Arlington || 49,195 || 24–17
|- bgcolor="ffbbbb"
| 42 || May 22 || @ Rangers || 3–4 || Almanzar (4–0) || Gordon (1–2) || — || The Ballpark in Arlington || 49,458 || 24–18
|- bgcolor="bbffbb"
| 43 || May 23 || @ Rangers || 8–3 || Vazquez (4–4) || Dickey (4–4) || — || The Ballpark in Arlington || 50,241 || 25–18
|- bgcolor="bbffbb"
| 44 || May 25 || @ Orioles || 11–3 || Lieber (4–1) || Bedard (1–2) || — || Oriole Park at Camden Yards || 42,846 || 26–18
|- bgcolor="bbffbb"
| 45 || May 26 || @ Orioles || 12–9 || Sturtze (1–0) || Ryan (1–2) || Rivera (16) || Oriole Park at Camden Yards || 37,610 || 27–18
|- bgcolor="bbffbb"
| 46 || May 27 || @ Orioles || 18–5 || Contreras (2–2) || Ponson (3–5) || — || Oriole Park at Camden Yards || 46,282 || 28–18
|- bgcolor="bbffbb"
| 47 || May 28 || @ Devil Rays || 7–5 || Vázquez (5–4) || Waechter (2–5) || Rivera (17) || Tropicana Field || 20,627 || 29–18
|- bgcolor="bbffbb"
| 48 || May 29 || @ Devil Rays || 5–3 || Brown (6–1) || Hendrickson (2–5) || Rivera (18) || Tropicana Field || 25,692 || 30–18
|- bgcolor="ffbbbb"
| 49 || May 30 || @ Devil Rays || 6–7 || Zambrano (5–4) || Lieber (4–2) || Baez (8) || Tropicana Field || 26,098 || 30–19

|- bgcolor="bbffbb"
| 50 || June 1 || Orioles || 8–7 || Mussina (6–4) || Ponson (3–6) || Rivera (19) || Yankee Stadium || 38,012 || 31–19
|- bgcolor="bbffbb"
| 51 || June 2 || Orioles || 6–5 || Prinz (1–0) || DuBose (4–4) || Rivera (20) || Yankee Stadium || 50,502 || 32–19
|- bgcolor="bbffbb"
| 52 || June 3 || Orioles || 5–2 || Vazquez (6–4) || Parrish (3–2) || Rivera (21) || Yankee Stadium || 44,020 || 33–19
|- bgcolor="bbffbb"
| 53 || June 4 || Rangers || 7–6 || Brown (7–1) || Powell (1–1) || Rivera (22) || Yankee Stadium || 49,372 || 34–19
|- bgcolor="ffbbbb"
| 54 || June 5 || Rangers || 1–8 || Dominguez (1–1) || Lieber (4–3) || — || Yankee Stadium || 51,910 || 34–20
|- bgcolor="bbffbb"
| 55 || June 6 || Rangers || 2–1 || Mussina (7–4) || Drese (2–3) || Rivera (23)  || Yankee Stadium || 54,092 || 35–20
|- bgcolor="bbffbb"
| 56 || June 8 || Rockies || 2–1 || Vázquez (7–4) || Fassero (0–6) || Rivera (24) || Yankee Stadium || 51,852 || 36–20
|- bgcolor="bbffbb"
| 57 || June 9 || Rockies || 7–5 || Quantrill (5–2) || Kennedy (4–4) || Rivera (25) || Yankee Stadium || 38,013 || 37–20
|- bgcolor="bbffbb"
| 58 || June 10 || Rockies || 10–4 || Contreras (3–2) || Jennings (5–6) || — || Yankee Stadium || 41,586 || 38–20
|- bgcolor="ffbbbb"
| 59 || June 11 || Padres || 2–10 || Eaton (3–6) || Heredia (0–1) || Otsuka (2) || Yankee Stadium || 49,855 || 38–21
|- bgcolor="bbffbb"
| 60 || June 12 || Padres || 3–2 || Lieber (5–3) || Tankersley (0–3) || Rivera (26) || Yankee Stadium || 54,280 || 39–21
|- bgcolor="bbffbb"
| 61 || June 13 || Padres || 6–5  || Heredia (1–1) || Beck (0–1) || — || Yankee Stadium || 52,754 || 40–21
|- bgcolor="bbffbb"
| 62 || June 15 || @ Diamondbacks || 4–2 || Contreras (4–2) || Webb (3–6) || Rivera (27) || Bank One Ballpark || 48,066 || 41–21
|- bgcolor="bbffbb"
| 63 || June 16 || @ Diamondbacks || 9–4 || Sturtze (2–0) || Fossum (1–5) || — || Bank One Ballpark || 48,274 || 42–21
|- bgcolor="ffbbbb"
| 64 || June 17 || @ Diamondbacks || 1–6 || Sparks (3–4) || Lieber (5–4) || Dessens (2) || Bank One Ballpark || 48,252 || 42–22
|- bgcolor="ffbbbb"
| 65 || June 18 || @ Dodgers || 3–6 || Weaver (5–7) || Vazquez (7–5) || Gagne (17) || Dodger Stadium || 55,207 || 42–23
|- bgcolor="bbffbb"
| 66 || June 19 || @ Dodgers || 6–2 || Halsey (1–0) || Nomo (3–8) || — || Dodger Stadium || 54,876 || 43–23
|- bgcolor="ffbbbb"
| 67 || June 20 || @ Dodgers || 4–5 || Lima (6–2) || Contreras (4–3) || Gagne (18) || Dodger Stadium || 55,157 || 43–24
|- bgcolor="bbffbb"
| 68 || June 22 || @ Orioles || 10–4 || Mussina (8–4) || Riley (1–3) || — || Oriole Park at Camden Yards || 49,696 || 44–24
|- bgcolor="ffbbbb"
| 69 || June 23 || @ Orioles || 2–13 || Bedard (2–2) || Lieber (5–5) || — || Oriole Park at Camden Yards || 41,678 || 44–25
|- bgcolor="bbffbb"
| 70 || June 24 || @ Orioles || 5–2 || Vazquez (8–5) || Ponson (3–10) || Rivera (28) || Oriole Park at Camden Yards || 48,442 || 45–25
|- bgcolor="bbbbbb"
| – || Jume 25 || Mets || colspan=8|Postponed (rain) Rescheduled for June 27
|- bgcolor="ffbbbb"
| 71 || Jume 26  || Mets || 3–9 || Leiter (3–2) || Halsey (1–1) || — || Yankee Stadium || 55,303 || 45–26
|- bgcolor="bbffbb"
| 72 || Jume 27  || Mets || 8–1 || Contreras (5–3) || Trachsel (7–6) || Gordon (2) || Yankee Stadium || 37,305 || 46–26
|- bgcolor="bbffbb"
| 73 || Jume 27  || Mets || 11–6 || Mussina (9–4) || Ginter (1–2) || — || Yankee Stadium || 55,387 || 47–26
|- bgcolor="bbffbb"
| 74 || June 29 || Red Sox || 11–3 || Vazquez (9–5) || Lowe (6–7) || — || Yankee Stadium || 55,231 || 48–26
|- bgcolor="bbffbb"
| 75 || June 30 || Red Sox || 4–2 || Gordon (2–2) || Timlin (4–3) || Rivera (29) || Yankee Stadium || 55,023 || 49–26

|- bgcolor="bbffbb"
| 76 || July 1 || Red Sox || 5–4  || Sturtze (3–0) || Leskanic (0–4) || — || Yankee Stadium || 55,265 || 50–26
|- bgcolor="ffbbbb"
| 77 || July 2 || @ Mets || 2–11 || Trachsel (8–6) || Mussina (9–5) || — || Shea Stadium || 55,068 || 50–27
|- bgcolor="ffbbbb"
| 78 || July 3 || @ Mets || 9–10 || Franco (2–4) || Sturtze (3–1) || — || Shea Stadium || 55,120 || 50–28
|- bgcolor="ffbbbb"
| 79 || July 4 || @ Mets || 5–6 || Moreno (2–1) || Gordon (2–3) || Looper (16) || Shea Stadium || 55,437 || 50–29
|- bgcolor="bbffbb"
| 80 || July 5 || Tigers || 10–3 || Lieber (6–5) || Robertson (7–4) || — || Yankee Stadium || 52,608 || 51–29
|- bgcolor="ffbbbb"
| 81 || July 6 || Tigers || 1–9 || Johnson (6–7) || Mussina (9–6) || — || Yankee Stadium || 41,772 || 51–30
|- bgcolor="ffbbbb"
| 82 || July 7 || Tigers || 8–10 || Bonderman (6–6) || Halsey (1–2) || Urbina (12) || Yankee Stadium || 50,338 || 51–31
|- bgcolor="bbffbb"
| 83 || July 8 || Devil Rays || 7–1 || Contreras (6–3) || Zambrano (9–5) || Rivera (30) || Yankee Stadium || 40,378 || 52–31
|- bgcolor="bbffbb"
| 84 || July 9 || Devil Rays || 5–4 || Vazquez (10–5) || Colome (2–2) || Rivera (31) || Yankee Stadium || 47,700 || 53–31
|- bgcolor="bbffbb"
| 85 || July 10 || Devil Rays || 6–3 || Lieber (7–5) || Brazelton (2–2) || Rivera (32) || Yankee Stadium || 54,680 || 54–31
|- bgcolor="bbffbb"
| 86 || July 11 || Devil Rays || 10–3 || Hernandez (1–0) || Hendrickson (6–7)  || — || Yankee Stadium || 53,383 || 55–31
|- bgcolor="bbcaff"
| colspan=10 | 75th All-Star Game in Houston, Texas
|- bgcolor="bbffbb"
| 87 || July 15 || @ Tigers || 5–1 || Contreras (7–3) || Bonderman (6–7) || — || Comerica Park || 38,902 || 56–31
|- bgcolor="ffbbbb"
| 88 || July 16 || @ Tigers || 0–8 || Maroth (6–7) || Vazquez (10–6) || — || Comerica Park || 40,918 || 56–32
|- bgcolor="bbffbb"
| 89 || July 17 || @ Tigers || 5–3 || Hernandez (2–0) || Knotts (5–4) || Rivera (33) || Comerica Park || 41,857 || 57–32
|- bgcolor="ffbbbb"
| 90 || July 18 || @ Tigers || 2–4 || Robertson (9–4) || Lieber (7–6) || Urbina (15) || Comerica Park || 40,132 || 57–33
|- bgcolor="ffbbbb"
| 91 || July 19 || @ Devil Rays || 7–9 || Carter (3–2) || Sturtze (3–2) || Baez (19) || Tropicana Field || 41,755 || 57–34
|- bgcolor="bbffbb"
| 92 || July 20 || @ Devil Rays || 4–2 || Contreras (8–3) || Zambrano (9–6) || Rivera (34) || Tropicana Field || 27,613 || 58–34
|- bgcolor="bbffbb"
| 93 || July 21 || Blue Jays || 10–3 || Vazquez (11–6) || Hentgen (2–9) || — || Yankee Stadium || 53,031 || 59–34
|- bgcolor="bbffbb"
| 94 || July 22 || Blue Jays || 1–0 || Rivera (1–0) || Chulk (0–2) || — || Yankee Stadium || 53,657 || 60–34
|- bgcolor="bbffbb"
| 95 || July 23 || @ Red Sox || 8–7 || Gordon (3–3) || Foulke (2–3) || Rivera (35) || Fenway Park || 34,933 || 61–34
|- bgcolor="ffbbbb"
| 96 || July 24 || @ Red Sox || 10–11 || Mendoza (1–0) || Rivera (1–1) || — || Fenway Park || 34,501 || 61–35
|- bgcolor="ffbbbb"
| 97 || July 25 || @ Red Sox || 6–9 || Lowe (9–9) || Contreras (8–4) || Foulke (16) || Fenway Park || 35,006 || 61–36
|- bgcolor="bbffbb"
| 98 || July 26 || @ Blue Jays || 6–5  || Rivera (2–1) || Frasor (3–3) || — || SkyDome || 30,041 || 62–36
|- bgcolor="bbffbb"
| 99 || July 27 || @ Blue Jays || 7–4 || Proctor (1–0) || Lightenberg (1–3) || Gordon (3) || SkyDome || 30,087 || 63–36
|- bgcolor="ffbbbb"
| 100 || July 28 || @ Blue Jays || 2–3  || Frasor (4–3) || Proctor (1–1) || — || SkyDome || 31,385 || 63–37
|- bgcolor="ffbbbb"
| 101 || July 29 || Orioles || 1–9 || Ponson (6–12) || Contreras (8–5) || — || Yankee Stadium || 51,677 || 63–38
|- bgcolor="bbffbb"
| 102 || July 30 || Orioles || 2–1 || Brown (8–1) || Cabrera (8–5) || Rivera (36) || Yankee Stadium || 51,551 || 64–38
|- bgcolor="bbffbb"
| 103 || July 31 || Orioles || 6–4 || Vazquez (12–6) || Bedard (4–6) || Rivera (37) || Yankee Stadium || 51,845 || 65–38

|- bgcolor="bbffbb"
| 104 || August 1 || Orioles || 9–7 || Hernandez (3–0) || Lopez (8–7)  || Rivera (38) || Yankee Stadium || 51,632 || 66–38
|- bgcolor="ffbbbb"
| 105 || August 3 || Athletics || 4–13 || Mulder (15–3) || Lieber (7–7) || — || Yankee Stadium || 50,625 || 66–39
|- bgcolor="bbffbb"
| 106 || August 4 || Athletics || 8–6  || Rivera (3–1) || Duchscherer (4–3) || — || Yankee Stadium || 47,885 || 67–39
|- bgcolor="bbffbb"
| 107 || August 5 || Athletics || 5–1 || Brown (9–1) || Zito (7–8)  || — || Yankee Stadium || 52,335 || 68–39
|- bgcolor="bbffbb"
| 108 || August 6 || Blue Jays || 11–4 || Vazquez (13–6) || Douglass (0–2) || — || Yankee Stadium || 48,900 || 69–39
|- bgcolor="bbffbb"
| 109 || August 7 || Blue Jays || 6–0 || Hernandez (4–0) || Lilly (8–8) || — || Yankee Stadium || 54,025 || 70–39
|- bgcolor="bbffbb"
| 110 || August 8 || Blue Jays || 8–2 || Lieber (8–7) || Batista (9–7) || — || Yankee Stadium || 52,616 || 71–39
|- bgcolor="ffbbbb"
| 111 || August 9 || Blue Jays || 4–5 || Towers (7–4) || Loaiza (9–6) || Frasor (15) || Yankee Stadium || 49,853 || 71–40
|- bgcolor="ffbbbb"
| 112 || August 10 || @ Rangers || 1–7 || Drese (9–6) || Brown (9–2) || — || The Ballpark in Arlington || 43,633 || 71–41
|- bgcolor="bbffbb"
| 113 || August 11 || @ Rangers || 4–2 || Sturtze (4–2) || Regilio (0–4) || Rivera (39) || The Ballpark in Arlington || 43,729 || 72–41
|- bgcolor="bbffbb"
| 114 || August 12 || @ Rangers || 5–1 || Hernandez (5–0) || Erickson (0–3) || — || The Ballpark in Arlington || 48,925 || 73–41
|- bgcolor="bbffbb"
| 115 || August 13 || @ Mariners || 11–3 || Lieber (9–7) || Villone (4–3) || — || Safeco Field || 46,359 || 74–41
|- bgcolor="bbffbb"
| 116 || August 14 || @ Mariners || 6–4 || Quantrill (6–2) || Hasegawa (4–5) || Rivera (40) || Safeco Field || 46,530 || 75–41
|- bgcolor="ffbbbb"
| 117 || August 15 || @ Mariners || 3–7 || Meche (3–5) || Nitkowski (1–1) || — || Safeco Field || 46,335 || 75–42
|- bgcolor="ffbbbb"
| 118 || August 17 || @ Twins || 2–8 || Radke (8–6) || Vazquez (13–7) || — || Hubert H. Humphrey Metrodome || 38,766 || 75–43
|- bgcolor="ffbbbb"
| 119 || August 18 || @ Twins || 2–7 || Santana (13–6) || Mussina (9–7) || — || Hubert H. Humphrey Metrodome || 41,125 || 75–44
|- bgcolor="bbffbb"
| 120 || August 19 || @ Twins || 13–10 || Gordon (4–3) || Nathan (1–1) || Rivera (41) || Hubert H. Humphrey Metrodome || 37,959 || 76–44
|- bgcolor="ffbbbb"
| 121 || August 20 || Angels || 0–5 || Ortiz (4–7) || Lieber (9–8) || — || Yankee Stadium || 53.530 || 76–45
|- bgcolor="ffbbbb"
| 122 || August 21 || Angels || 1–6 || Shields (7–2) || Loaiza (9–7) || — || Yankee Stadium || 54,008 || 76–46
|- bgcolor="ffbbbb"
| 123 || August 22 || Angels || 3–4 || Escobar (8–9) || Brown (9–3) || Percival (24) || Yankee Stadium || 53,885 || 76–47
|- bgcolor="bbffbb"
| 124 || August 23 || @ Indians || 6–4 || Gordon (5–3) || Wickman (0–1) || Rivera (42) || Jacobs Field || 33,172 || 77–47
|- bgcolor="bbffbb"
| 125 || August 24 || @ Indians || 5–4 || Gordon (6–3) || Wickman (0–2) || Rivera (43) || Jacobs Field || 31,729 || 78–47
|- bgcolor="ffbbbb"
| 126 || August 25 || @ Indians || 3–4 || Riske (7–2) || Gordon (6–4) || Betancourt (3) || Jacobs Field || 30,605 || 78–48
|- bgcolor="bbffbb"
| 127 || August 26 || @ Blue Jays || 7–4 || Nitkowski (2–1) || Frasor (4–4) || Rivera (44) || SkyDome || 35,682 || 79–48
|- bgcolor="bbffbb"
| 128 || August 27 || @ Blue Jays || 8–7 || Sturtze (5–2) || Miller (2–3) || Gordon (4) || SkyDome || 35,436 || 80–48
|- bgcolor="bbffbb"
| 129 || August 28 || @ Blue Jays || 18–6 || Brown (10–3) || Lilly (9–9) || Rivera (45) || SkyDome || 43,541 || 81–48
|- bgcolor="ffbbbb"
| 130 || August 29 || @ Blue Jays || 4–6 || Batista (10–10) || Mussina (9–8) || Frasor (17) || SkyDome || 44,072 || 81–49
|- bgcolor="ffbbbb"
| 131 || August 31 || Indians || 0–22 || Westbrook (12–6) || Vazquez (13–8) || — || Yankee Stadium || 51,777 || 81–50
|-

|- bgcolor="bbffbb"
| 132 || September 1 || Indians || 5–3 || Hernandez (6–0) || Sabathia (10–9) || Rivera (46) || Yankee Stadium || 41,448 || 82–50
|- bgcolor="bbffbb"
| 133 || September 2 || Indians || 9–1 || Lieber (10–8) || Lee (10–7) || — || Yankee Stadium || 37,963 || 83–50
|- bgcolor="ffbbbb"
| 134 || September 3 || Orioles || 1–3 || Lopez (11–8) || Brown (10–4) || Julio (20) || Yankee Stadium || 44,148 || 83–51
|- bgcolor="ffbbbb"
| 135 || September 4 || Orioles || 0–7 || Ponson (10–13) || Mussina (9–9) || — || Yankee Stadium || 48,963 || 83–52
|- bgcolor="bbffbb"
| 136 || September 5 || Orioles || 4–3 || Rivera (4–1) || Julio (2–3) || — || Yankee Stadium || 48,252 || 84–52
|- bgcolor="bbffbb"
| 137 || September 6  || Devil Rays || 7–4 || Hernandez (7–0) || Waechter (3–7) || Quantrill (1) || Yankee Stadium || 44,422 || 85–52
|- bgcolor="bbbbbb"
| – || September 6  || Devil Rays || colspan=8|Postponed Rescheduled for September 8
|- bgcolor="bbffbb"
| 138 || September 7 || Devil Rays || 11–2 || Lieber (11–8) || Sosa (3–4) || — || Yankee Stadium || 33,518 || 86–52
|- bgcolor="bbbbbb"
| – || September 8  || Devil Rays || colspan=8|Postponed (rain) Rescheduled for September 23
|- bgcolor="bbbbbb"
| – || September 8  || Devil Rays || colspan=8|Postponed (rain) Rescheduled for September 9
|- bgcolor="bbffbb"
| 139 || September 9  || Devil Rays || 9–1 || Mussina (10–9) || Brazelton (6–7) || — || Yankee Stadium || N/A || 87–52
|- bgcolor="bbffbb"
| 140 || September 9  || Devil Rays || 10–5 || Sturtze (6–2) || Bell (6–8) || — || Yankee Stadium || 41,230 || 88–52
|- bgcolor="ffbbbb"
| 141 || September 10 || @ Orioles || 8–14 || Lopez (12–8) || Vazquez (13–9) || — || Oriole Park at Camden Yards || 48,026 || 88–53
|- bgcolor="bbffbb"
| 142 || September 11 || @ Orioles || 5–2 || Hernandez (8–0) || Ponson (10–14) || Rivera (47) || Oriole Park at Camden Yards || 47,858 || 89–53
|- bgcolor="bbffbb"
| 143 || September 12 || @ Orioles || 9–7 || Gordon (7–4) || Julio (2–5) || Rivera (48) || Oriole Park at Camden Yards || 47,780 || 90–53
|- bgcolor="ffbbbb"
| 144 || September 13 || @ Royals || 8–17 || Anderson (4–11) || Halsey (1–3) || — || Kauffman Stadium || 23,951 || 90–54
|- bgcolor="bbffbb"
| 145 || September 14 || @ Royals || 4–0 || Mussina (11–9) || Greinke (8–10) || — || Kauffman Stadium || 23,426 || 91–54
|- bgcolor="bbffbb"
| 146 || September 15 || @ Royals || 3–0 || Vazquez (14–9) || May (9–18) || Rivera (49) || Kauffman Stadium || 22,418 || 92–54
|- bgcolor="ffbbbb"
| 147 || September 17 || Red Sox || 2–3 || Timlin (5–4) || Rivera (4–2) || Foulke (30) || Yankee Stadium || 55,128 || 92–55
|- bgcolor="bbffbb"
| 148 || September 18 || Red Sox || 14–4 || Lieber (12–8) || Lowe (14–12) || — || Yankee Stadium || 55,153 || 93–55
|- bgcolor="bbffbb" 
| 149 || September 19 || Red Sox || 11–1 || Mussina (12–9) || Martinez (16–7) || — || Yankee Stadium || 55,142 || 94–55
|- bgcolor="ffbbbb"
| 150 || September 20 || Blue Jays || 3–6 || Chacin (1–0) || Vazquez (14–10) || Batista (2) || Yankee Stadium || 10,732 || 94–56
|- bgcolor="bbffbb"
| 151 || September 21 || Blue Jays || 5–3 || Loaiza (10–7) || Halladay (7–8) || Rivera (50) || Yankee Stadium || 36,675 || 95–56
|- bgcolor="ffbbbb"
| 152 || September 22 || Blue Jays || 4–5 || Lilly (12–10) || Hernandez (8–1) || Batista (3) || Yankee Stadium || 49,560 || 95–57
|- bgcolor="bbffbb"
| 153 || September 23 || Devil Rays || 7–3 || Lieber (13–8) || Ritchie (0–2) || — || Yankee Stadium || 29,501 || 96–57
|- bgcolor="bbffbb"
| 154 || September 24 || @ Red Sox || 6–4 || Gordon (8–4) || Martinez (16–8) || Rivera (51) || Fenway Park || 35,022 || 97–57
|- bgcolor="ffbbbb"
| 155 || September 25 || @ Red Sox || 5–12 || Foulke (5–3) || Quantrill (6–3) || — || Fenway Park || 34,856 || 97–58
|- bgcolor="ffbbbb"
| 156 || September 26 || @ Red Sox || 4–11 || Schilling (21–6) || Brown (10–5) || — || Fenway Park || 34,582 || 97–59
|- bgcolor="bbbbbb"
| – || September 28 || Twins || colspan=8|Postponed (rain) Rescheduled for September 29
|- bgcolor="bbffbb"
| 157 || September 29  || Twins || 5–3 || Quantrill (7–3) || Romero (7–4) || Rivera (52) || Yankee Stadium || N/A || 98–59
|- bgcolor="bbffbb"
| 158 || September 29  || Twins || 5–4 || Lieber (14–8) || Lohse (8–12) || Rivera (53) || Yankee Stadium || 45,072 || 99–59
|- bgcolor="bbffbb"
| 159 || September 30 || Twins || 6–4 || Gordon (9–4) || Fultz (3–3) || — || Yankee Stadium || 48,454 || 100–59
|-

|- bgcolor="ffbbbb"
| 160 || October 1 || @ Blue Jays || 0–7 || Bush (5–4) || Hernandez (8–2) || — || SkyDome || 48,914 || 100–60
|- bgcolor="ffbbbb"
| 161 || October 2 || @ Blue Jays || 2–4 || Halladay (8–8) || Brown (10–6) || Batista (5) || SkyDome || 50,498 || 100–61
|- bgcolor="bbffbb"
| 162 || October 3 || @ Blue Jays || 3–2 || Proctor (2–1) || Towers (9–9) || Sturtze (1) || SkyDome || 49,948 || 101–61

Player stats

Batting
Note: G = Games played; AB = At bats; H = Hits; Avg. = Batting average; HR = Home runs; RBI = Runs batted in

Other batters
Note: G = Games played; AB = At bats; H = Hits; Avg. = Batting average; HR = Home runs; RBI = Runs batted in

Pitching

Starting pitchers
Note: G = Games pitched; IP = Innings pitched; W = Wins; L = Losses; ERA = Earned run average; SO = Strikeouts

Other pitchers
Note: G = Games pitched; IP = Innings pitched; W = Wins; L = Losses; ERA = Earned run average; SO = Strikeouts

Relief pitchers
Note: G = Games pitched; W = Wins; L = Losses; SV = Saves; ERA = Earned run average; SO = Strikeouts

 Postseason 
 Game log 

|- bgcolor="ffbbbb"
| 1 || October 5 || Twins || 0–2 || Santana (1–0) || Mussina (0–1) || Nathan (1) || Yankee Stadium || 55,749 || 0–1
|- bgcolor="bbffbb"
| 2 || October 6 || Twins || 7–6  || Quantrill (1–0) || Nathan (0–1) || — || Yankee Stadium || 56,354 || 1–1
|- bgcolor="bbffbb"
| 3 || October 8 || @ Twins || 8–4 || Brown (1–0) || Silva (0–1) || — || Hubert H. Humphrey Metrodome || 54,803 || 2–1
|- bgcolor="bbffbb"
| 4 || October 9 || @ Twins || 6–5  || Rivera (1–0) || Lohse (0–1) || — || Hubert H. Humphrey Metrodome || 52,498 || 3–1
|-

|- bgcolor="bbffbb"
| 1 || October 12 || Red Sox || 10–7 || Mussina (1–0) || Schilling (0–1) || Rivera (1) || Yankee Stadium || 56,135 || 1–0
|- bgcolor="bbffbb"
| 2 || October 13 || Red Sox || 3–1 || Lieber (1–0) || Martinez (0–1) || Rivera (2) || Yankee Stadium || 56,136 || 2–0
|- bgcolor="bbbbbb"
| – || October 15 || @ Red Sox || colspan=8|Postponed (rain) Rescheduled for October 16
|- bgcolor="bbffbb"
| 3 || October 16 || @ Red Sox || 19–8 || Vazquez (1–0) || Mendoza (0–1) || — || Fenway Park || 35,126 || 3–0
|- bgcolor="ffbbbb"
| 4 || October 17 || @ Red Sox || 4–6  || Leskanic (1–0) || Quantrill (0–1) || — || Fenway Park || 34,826 || 3–1
|- bgcolor="ffbbbb"
| 5 || October 18 || @ Red Sox || 4–5  || Wakefield (1–0) || Loaiza (0–1) || — || Fenway Park || 35,120 || 3–2
|- bgcolor="ffbbbb"
| 6 || October 19 || Red Sox || 2–4 || Schilling (1–1) || Lieber (1–1) || Foulke (1) || Yankee Stadium || 56,128 || 3–3
|- bgcolor="ffbbbb"
| 7 || October 20 || Red Sox || 3–10 || Lowe (1–0) || Brown (0–1) || — || Yankee Stadium || 56,129 || 3–4
|-

Awards and records
 Derek Jeter, Shortstop, Gold Glove
 Gary Sheffield, Outfield, Silver Slugger
 Mariano Rivera, Yankees Single Season Record, Most Saves in a Season (53)2004 MLB All-Star Game' Jason Giambi, first baseman, starter
 Alex Rodriguez, third baseman, starter
 Derek Jeter, shortstop, starter
 Mariano Rivera, relief pitcher, reserve
 Javier Vasquez, pitcher, reserve
 Hideki Matsui, outfield, reserve
 Gary Sheffield, outfield, reserve

Farm system

Baseball America 2005 Annual Directory

References

External links
2004 New York Yankees at Baseball Reference2004 New York Yankees at Baseball Almanac''

New York Yankees seasons
New York Yankees
New York Yankees
2000s in the Bronx
American League East champion seasons